Carl von Horn may refer to:

Carl von Horn (1847–1923), was a Bavarian Colonel General and War Minister
Carl von Horn (1903–1989), was a Swedish Army general